Moulin rouge was a gloss men's magazine in Russia. It was published by Rodionov Publishing House from 2003 to 2008.

References

External links
 

2003 establishments in Russia
2008 disestablishments in Russia
Defunct magazines published in Russia
Magazines established in 2003
Magazines disestablished in 2008
Men's magazines
Pornographic magazines
Magazines published in Russia
Russian-language magazines
Monthly magazines published in Russia